Long Run is an unincorporated community in Craig Township, Switzerland County, in the U.S. state of Indiana.

History
A post office was established at Long Run in 1874, and remained in operation until it was discontinued in 1907.

Geography

References

Unincorporated communities in Switzerland County, Indiana
Unincorporated communities in Indiana